The confederal militias were a movement of people's militia organized during the Spanish civil war by the dominant organizations of anarchism in Spain: the National Confederation of Labor (CNT) and the Iberian Anarchist Federation (FAI).

These militias played an important role in the Revolution of 1934. They were not the only ones, since other militias belonging to other organizations, parties and trade unions also played a role in the revolution, such as those of POUM ("Workers' Party of Marxist Unification"), those of the Syndicalist Party (PS) and those of the General Union of Workers (UGT). After the coup d'état of July 1936, armed groups of civilian volunteers organized by the parties and trade unions formed in the areas where the uprising failed, joined the remains of the regular army units and state security forces that had remained loyal to the Republic.

Volunteers in these militias declined to wear uniforms, give the military echelon a salute, and perform other formal military duties. The officers, elected, could quickly succeed one another at the head of a group and the men felt they had the right to discuss the orders and only apply them if they were in agreement.

As the war progressed, the militias were progressively dissolved and assimilated into the Spanish Republican Army, in spite of many militiamen refusing the militarization.

The CNT Defense Committees 
The origin of the CNT militias in the Spanish Civil War is in the Defense Committees, clandestine military organizations of the CNT that were financed by and subordinate to the unions. The essential functions of the defense committees were twofold: arms and administration. These committees were a reorganization and expansion of different affinity groups, such as Los Solidarios, who fought against the bosses' pistolerismo between 1917 and 1923.

In 1934, other factions began to organize their own clandestine militias. The Communist Party formed the Antifascist Worker and Peasant Militias. The Carlists formed the Frente Nacional de Boinas Rojas, in an attempt to create a hierarchical national Requeté structure, detached from local Carlist juntas. The newly founded Falange Española de las JONS also formed their own militia, the Primera Línea.

In October 1934, the CNT Defense Committees abandoned the old affinity group tactic in favor of serious and methodical revolutionary preparation:

The basic defense group had to be small in order to facilitate its secrecy. It had to be made up of six militants, with very specific functions:

 Secretary, in charge of contacting other cadres, creating new groups and preparing reports.
 Personal Investigator, in charge of assessing the danger posed by enemies, such as priests, the military, and pistoleros.
 Building Investigator, in charge of drafting up blueprints and the preparation of statistical reports.
 Researcher, in charge of determining strategic points and tactics for street fighting.
 Researcher, in charge of studying public services: electricity, water, gas, sewerage.
 Investigator, in charge of determining where to obtain arms, money and supplies.

To that ideal figure of six, one more member could be added to cover “high-profile” tasks. The clandestinity of the group had to be absolute. They were the basic nucleus of a revolutionary armed force, capable of mobilizing larger secondary groups, and these, in turn, the entire people.

The scope of action of each defense group was a very precise demarcation within each neighborhood, indicated on a map. The neighborhood defense committee coordinated all these defense cadres, and received a monthly report from each of the group secretaries. The defense committees were also organized at the regional and national level, due to the importance of communications and coordination in a revolutionary insurrection.

The Defense Committees were replaced, in August 1936, by the Control Patrols acting under the command of the Central Committee of Antifascist Militias of Catalonia. However, the defense committees were reactivated during the Barcelona May Days, when the Spanish Republic clashed with the CNT-FAI and POUM, in a dispute over the control of Revolutionary Catalonia.

Central Committee of Antifascist Militias of Catalonia

On July 19, 1936 in Barcelona, the military garrison had about six thousand men, compared to almost two thousand assault guards and two hundred Mossos d'Esquadra. The Civil Guard, who were split between both sides were about three thousand. The CNT-FAI had about twenty thousand militants (among some 200,000 affiliates), organized in neighborhood defense committees. In the CNT's liaison commission with the Government of Catalonia and the loyalist military, they promised to stop the coup plotters with only a thousand armed militants.

There was a double transformation of those defense cadres. That of the popular militias, who defined the Aragon front in the first days, establishing the collectivization of land in the liberated Aragonese towns; and that of the revolutionary committees that brought about a "new revolutionary order", in every neighborhood of Barcelona and in every town in Catalonia. Their common origin in the defense cadres meant that confederal militias and revolutionary committees were always very united and interrelated. Those local committees, in some towns, were the result of the relationship of forces existing in each locality, and sometimes they were merely front-populist organs, without any revolutionary aspiration.

The revolutionary committees carried out important administrative tasks ranging from the issuance of food vouchers, safe conduct passes, wedding celebrations, supply and maintenance of hospitals, to the expropriation of food, furniture and buildings, financing of secular education and schools managed by the Libertarian Youth, payments to militiamen, or to their families, etc.

On July 21, a Plenum of Local and Regional unions of the CNT renounced the very coordination and extension of power that the revolutionary committees already exercised in the streets. It was decided to accept the creation of the Central Committee of Anti-fascist Militias of Catalonia (CCMA), an organism in which all anti-fascist organizations participated.

As of this moment, it was the CCMA and not the CNT-FAI who directed the military operations in Catalonia and, from there, the Aragon front. On July 24, the first two anarchist columns departed, under the command of Buenaventura Durruti and Antonio Ortiz Ramírez. In those same days, columns of the PSUC and the POUM were also formed. In two months, the committee managed to organize 20,000 militiamen who were spread out across a 300-kilometer front. The aforementioned defense committees ceased to operate in Barcelona since either their members were in the neighborhood committees organizing the revolution, or they were on the war fronts. They remained inactive until May 1937.

Between July 21 and mid-August 1936 the Control Patrols were established by the CCMA. Approximately half of the 700 patrollers had a CNT card, or were from the FAI; the other half was affiliated with the rest of the component organizations of the CCMA: POUM, Esquerra Republicana de Catalunya (ERC) and PSUC. Only four section delegates, out of the eleven existing, were from the CNT: those from Poblenou, Sants, Harmonia and Clot; four others were from ERC, three from PSUC and none from POUM.

What was happening in Barcelona was of transcendental importance for the CNT in all of Spain since it was in this city where it had the most affiliates, its best militant cadres, and its most powerful and veteran organization. It was then in Barcelona where the decisions made by the CNT were going to affect the future course of the entire CNT in the country.

The columns

Origin of the column as a popular combat formation 
The Castilian guerrillas of the War of Spanish Succession (1701 - 1715) and the guerrilla war on the Portuguese-Extremadura border between 1641 and 1668 were able be early examples of the use of columns in armed conflict. During the Spanish War of Independence columns were formed as conglomerates grouping together various regular military or civilian forces and services on a modest scale. The columns, due to their mobility and autonomy, constituted a basic form of organization for the guerrilla war. The national militia used them extensively throughout the 19th century.

In the Spanish Civil War, irregular military formations formed by armed volunteers mixed in with soldiers and other members of the state security forces. This situation occurred on both sides. For example, in the Nationalist faction the Requetes, Falangists and the military all formed into columns until mid-September when they were reorganized into battalions and brigades.

In the Republican faction militias are also formed from the first days of the civil war. For example, in Asturias, militant socialists formed the Asturian Miners Column on July 18, in order to counter the coup in Madrid. However, when he reached Benavente, Zamora, he turned around when news was received that the military, under the command of Antonio Aranda Mata, had revolted in Oviedo. In Huelva, the Riotinto Mining Column tried to quell the uprising in Seville, but it was betrayed by the Civil Guard which ambushed them in Camas.

Another column with similar luck would be the one organized in Valencia at the behest of the republic's Delegated Government Board, at that moment in a power dispute with the UGT-CNT's Popular Executive Committee, which had governed Valencia in the days after the uprising. The board ignored the warnings of the UGT and CNT and sent a column of about 500 civil guards and about 200 volunteer militiamen to Teruel. When they neared the city, the civil guard executed the militiamen and defected to the Nationalists, establishing a military base in Teruel during the first days of the war.

For the liberation of Albacete from control by the nationalist civil guard, two columns of soldiers, assault guards and militiamen from Alicante, Cartagena and Murcia quickly took Almansa and Hellín. Throughout their journey, they were joined by militiamen that had fled from the towns controlled by the nationalists. On the morning of July 25 they converged near Albacete and faced the rebels, liberating the city at dusk.

In the chaos of the first days of war, on 21 July a column was sent to Vitoria by the nationalist military authorities at Donostia. But, the column received news of the uprising of the Donostia garrison in Mondragón. Given the situation, the column's commander Pérez Garmendia decided to suspend the advance on the Alava capital and returned to Eibar with 30 civil guards and an ensign. The provincial authorities were concentrated in the town with the civil governor in charge.

The march to liberate Donostia was organized in Eibar. For this, a reinforcement column arrived from Bilbao, under the command of the ensign of the assault guard Justo Rodríguez Ribas, it was composed of: "three armored cars with 23 riflemen; two buses with 44 riflemen; an assault mortar car with four guards, another assault car with 30 guards and several vehicles with 57 dynamite riflemen; a health ambulance with four nurses, a doctor, a driver, and two Assault practitioners. They also had a shuttle car, manned by four militiamen. In total the column of 166 men with munitions, grenades, mortars, projectile boxes and abundant dynamite was made up" 

Until October 1936 the militias on both sides were columns commanded by the military or by well-known party and union militants. In the Republican faction the military appointed a left-wing militant as a political commissar due to the great distrust generated by the Spanish military during the first months of the war. The role of the political commissariat was twofold, on the one hand trying to keep the morale of the troops high, and on the other, monitoring the actions of the military elements.

Organization 
Many of the anarchist leaders in the war had been committed antimilitarists, even having to flee the country so as not to do military service. This antimilitarism permeated the discourse of many anarchist groups, and contrasted with the revolutionary spirit that also emerged from Iberian anarchism. Therefore, anarchist columns were organized under assembly principles and decisions were made through direct democracy, thus avoiding command hierarchies. The militias of the POUM — a revolutionary Marxist party that throughout the war became a tactical ally of anarchists - organized in a similar way.

The system favored the rapid formation of units.

 The "group" of twenty-five people was the simplest combat unit. The soldiers themselves chose a delegate, dismissable at any time, responsible for representing them.
 The “century” was composed of four groups, that is to say one hundred people, with a century delegate;
 The "grouping" was composed of five centuries, that is to say five hundred people, and had its own elected delegate;
 The "column" was the sum of the existing groupings. A general delegate of each column was elected.

Columns also consisted of internationalist Autonomous Groups, as well as Guerrilla Groups that were on missions behind enemy lines. These combat units were flexible, being able to vary the number of militiamen framed within them and the number of smaller units that make them up.

A war committee advised by a military-technical council coordinated the column's operations. At the head of the war committee was the general delegate of the column. All the delegates of all ranks lacked privileges and hierarchical command.

Famous columns 
The most famous of the CNT columns were those that left from Barcelona to liberate Zaragoza and Huesca. They were the large columns led by known anarchist militants, which included the first groups of foreign fighters, and when they were dissolved into the republican army, they came to be led by anarchists until the end of the war.

In their attempt to take these two cities they established the Aragon front. In general, four main columns of the CNT were established: the Durruti Column, the South Ebro Column, the Ascaso Column and the Harriers Column. Apart from these, there were quite a few groups of Aragonese confederal militias, which ended up converging on these four columns. At the beginning of September 1936, the front had around 20,000 combatants, with 13,000 belonging to the CNT. The columns from Barcelona and Lérida mainly went towards Huesca and Zaragoza, the Valencian ones went towards Teruel, repeatedly besieging the three provincial capitals. Around 8,500 fighters surrounded Teruel, almost 5,000 from the CNT.

Durruti Column

The Durruti Column left Barcelona on July 24, made up of some 2,500 militiamen, and headed directly for Zaragoza, aiming at the recovery of the city. They reached barely 22 kilometers from the city. From that moment on, the column was left with scarce supplies and could not launch a new attack, so it devoted itself to the consolidation of the defensive front, as well as to tasks of propagating and building the revolution through the lands of Aragon. He installed his headquarters in the town of Bujaraloz, Zaragoza.

In November Durruti was called to collaborate in the defense of Madrid, but he was not allowed to take more than a part of the column (about 1,400 out of more than 6,000 militiamen that the column had at the time). This section of the column was decimated in Madrid, in the Battle of Ciudad Universitaria, and Durruti died there from a point-blank shot of unknown origin on November 20. He was replaced at the head of the  Durruti Column  in Madrid by Ricardo Sanz. In Aragon, the column was commanded by José Manzana who ended up accepting its militarization, thus becoming the 26th Division. Ricardo Sanz took command of the entire column in April 1937. Together they fought in the Battle of Belchite and in the defense of Catalonia in January 1939.

South Ebro Column
The South Ebro Column was directed by the cabinetmaker Antonio Ortiz Ramírez, with Fernando Salavera as military adviser. They left Barcelona on July 24, 1936 by train and highway, growing from 800 men at the beginning to over 2,000, quite a few of whom were soldiers. The column participated in the taking of Caspe, dominated by a company of the Civil Guard and some 200 Aragonese Falangists, under the command of Captain Negrete.

Various units were incorporated into the column. Among them, at the beginning of September, the small Carod-Ferrer column, which had just occupied Fuendetodos, was added and parapetized before Villanueva de Boil. Along with this group was another party, the Hilario-Zamora column, which was led by the anarchist Hilario Esteban, together with Santiago López Oliver. This column came from Lérida. These two groups ended up unifying with the "Ortiz" Column. Shortly after, 650 soldiers arrived from Tarragona, under the command of Martínez Peñalver, who also joined the column. They also received reinforcements from some Valencian militias.

After militarization, the South Ebro column was dissolved into the republican 25th Division. After the Battle of Belchite, the head of the Eastern Army Sebastián Pozas Perea decided to withdraw command of the 25th division from Ortiz, replacing him with Miguel García Vivancos.

Ascaso Column

The third anarcho-syndicalist column organized in Barcelona left for Aragon on July 25, with 2,000 militiamen. Somewhat better armed than the previous two, it had 4 or 6 machine guns and 3 or 4 armored trucks (Tiznaos) transformed by a Gavà metalworker. The Ascaso column included the Italian internationalist groups "Justice and Freedom" and the "Battalion of Death" ( Centuria Malatesta). It was based in the province of Huesca, and was run by Cristóbal Alvaldetrecu, Gregorio Jover and Domingo Ascaso.

After militarization, the column became the republican 28th Division and was led by Gregorio Jover.

Harriers Column

The Harriers Column was the last of the great Catalan anarcho-syndicalist columns. Later more militias would come out of Catalonia, but they would no longer do so in the form of a column but rather as reinforcement units of the existing columns. In reality, this column had been foreseen to be a large unit - of around 10,000 combatants - but it ended up being a reinforcement of the Ascaso Column - as an autonomous column of about 1,700 militiamen. Organized in the Bakunin barracks in Barcelona, on August 28 it was sent to Grañén, on the Huesca front. García Oliver and Miguel García Vivancos came out in front of the column with José Guarner as military adviser. In September, García Vivancos agreed to the militarization of the column. Later a group had to be sent home due to their opposition to militarization. The column was incorporated into the 125th Mixed Brigade and participated in the battles of Belchite and Fuentes de Ebro, as well as in the defense of Catalonia, retreating to France after their defeat.

Iron Column

The Iron Column left Valencia with the intention of liberating Teruel from the nationalists. They left on 7–8 August 1936 with about 800 militiamen in two groups. By the end of August they had grown to about 1,600, and in September about 3,000. In the rear there was even a strong group of supporters, of up to 20,000 men and women, who were on the waiting list to join. After being militarized, it became the 83rd Mixed Brigade.

Other Columns
 Red and Black Column. A Catalan column formed by militiamen who had taken part in the Battle of Majorca. They were assigned to the province of Huesca on the Aragon front where they arrived in September. It was commanded by the syndicalists García Prada and Giménez Pajarero. This column soon became subordinate to the Harriers Column. It gave rise to the formation of the 127th Mixed Brigade.
 Land and Freedom Column. This column, of 1500 militiamen, was organized at the initiative of Federica Montseny and Diego Abad de Santillán. Its delegate was the Portuguese Germinal de Souza. The libertarian column was formed with volunteers from the ill-fated Battle of Majorca. The column was formed behind the back of the Central Committee of Militias. According to the testimony of García Oliver, the formation of this column was the cause of friction and confrontations between the CNT leaders in the Central Committee of Militias. The Land and Freedom Column voted against militarization, along with the Iron Column. After becoming militarized, the column gave rise to the 153rd Mixed Brigade.
 Torres-Benedito Column. A Valencian column commanded by Jesús Velasco Echave, deployed from Muletón to Valdecebro. It was made up of about 800 men from the armed forces and about 1,800 militiamen; totaling 2,600 troops. In the winter of 1936-1937 it became a part of the 81st Mixed Brigade.
 Iberia Column. Another column from Valencia created in September at the request of the Levante FAI. It joined the rest of the columns in the Teruel front. It was considered a shock column. During the militarization it remained at the disposal of the Teruel front command. The 81st Mixed Brigade emerged from its militarization, and some of its troops were also used to form the 94th Mixed Brigade.
 CNT 13 Column. Another column from Valencia also created in September. It was directed by the cenetista Santiago Tronchoni and had 900 militiamen. At the end of November, it had about 1,200 militiamen. It was transformed into the "Elite" battalion.
 Spirit and Rebellion Column. Another column from Valencia that would be used to cover gaps in the Teruel front line. It was the first Levantine confederal column to be militarized without ever having entered into combat. It was divided into 2 battalions, one was absorbed into the XIII International Brigade and the other became part of the 84th Mixed Brigade.
 First Confederal Column. Valencian column of about 1500 militiamen that in March 1937 replaced the Iron Column, after it was removed from the front to rest and reorganize. On April 1, it became the 82nd Mixed Brigade.
 Maroto Column. Confederal column that left Alicante for Granada. It had about 600 militiamen at the beginning, growing to 1,200 in October. Their delegate was Francisco Maroto del Ojo. The column became the 147th Mixed Brigade.
 Andalusia-Extremadura Column. This column came from Madrid. It was composed of Andalusian and Extremaduran militiamen from different units who fought in July and August and who were disorganized until September 1936. They fought, as the name suggests, on the Extremadura and Córdoba-Jaén fronts. It had more than 4,000 militiamen by November 1936. In early 1937 the column became the 88th Mixed Brigade.
 CEFA Column. CEFA comes from "Spanish Confederation of Anarchist Federations". Organized by anarchist groups from Málaga, it was directed by the Granada-born propagandist Morales Guzmán.
 Free Spain Column. The Free Spain Column was initially the Free Spain Battalion of the CNT's Cipriano Mera Column in Madrid. It later quadrupled into 4 CNT Battalions of Alicante and Murcia (No. 1 to 4), in the Columns of Arturo Mena in the Central and Guadalajara area, and was named the "Free Spain Column". It was led by Gabriel Venegas and José Sánchez Rodríguez. In October 1936 it had about 1,236 men and in December there were 2,215. It was awarded to the Prada Column of the Spanish Republican Army in the defense of Madrid. In November 1936, they detained republican ministers in who were leaving in Tarancón for Valencia, but they continued on their way thanks to the intervention of Cipriano Mera. It was absorbed into the 70th Mixed Brigade.
 Rosal Column. This column was made up of the Mora Battalion, the Ferrer Battalion, the Orobón Fernández Battalion, the Libertarian Youth Battalion, and 8 centuries of the Land and Freedom Column. Some battalions were integrated into the 39th Mixed Brigade. It was led by the cenetistas Cipriano Mera and Eusebio Sanz, and the republican officer Francisco del Rosal Rico. This brigade was integrated into the 14th Division. The 59th, 60th and 61st Mixed Brigades, which together formed the 42nd Division, also emerged from the column.

The CNT battalions 

The CNT militias functioned in the form of columns, especially in Catalonia and Valencia. In order to operate better, they were subdivided into Groups or Divisions, which were equivalent to the battalions in Aragon and Valencia respectively. When the militarization of the columns came, they first became Mixed Brigades, and the Catalan ones, which were more numerous, directly became divisions.

Central Fronts 
In other areas the form of organization of the militias took that of the battalions. Among the Madrid columns there were several battalions such as the "Free Spain", "Águilas de la Libertad", "Spartacus", "Mora", "Ferrer", "Orobón Fernández", "Juvenil Libertario", "Sigüenza" and "Toledo" battalions, which were fighting in both locations. In addition individual cenetistas would often integrate other republican columns, such as the Mangada Column which had numerous cenetistas. The CNT of the Center even organized up to 23,000 militiamen in December 1936, rivaling the numbers of the Fifth Regiment.

Southern Fronts 
In Extremadura the "Pío Sopena Battalion" was formed, under the command of Olegario Pachón. In Bujalance, Córdoba, the Andalusia-Extremadura Column was organized at the end of September from the remains of the different centuries and militia columns of the Andalusian CNT such as the "Centuria de los Gavilanes" from Bujalance, the "Arcas" Battalion and the "Zimmerman" Battalion from Seville, the "Pancho Villa" Battalion from Jaén, Castro del Río and Baena , the "Alcoy Battalion" created by Levantine militiamen who had already operated in the Córdoba offensive; the "Fermín Salvochea" Battalion, from Almodóvar del Río and Villaviciosa, was formed on August 20. It was led by the brothers Juan, Francisco and Sebastián Rodríguez Muñoz known as "Los Jubiles", anarchists from Bujalance.

In Málaga there were also libertarian battalion: the "Juan Arcas", "Pedro López", "Ascaso No. 1", "Ascaso No. 2", "Raya", "Makhno", "Andrés Naranjo", "Sebastian Fauré", "Libertad" and "Fermín Salvochea" battalions. Libertarians always predominated on this front.

Northern Fronts 
On the northern fronts the battalion system was implemented from September–October 1936. After operating during the first months in mixed columns, they created battalions separated by ideology. This was the case in Asturias where the following battalions were created in October:

  'CNT nº1' . Commanded by Miguélez.
  'CNT nº2' . Commanded by Onofre García Tirador. Based in Villaviciosa.
  'CNT nº3' . Commanded by Víctor Álvarez González.
  'CNT nº4' . Commanded by Celestino Fernández.
  'CNT nº5' . Commanded by Higinio Carrocera.
  'CNT nº6' . Commanded by Faustino Rodríguez.
  'CNT nº7' . Commanded by Mario Cuesta.
  'CNT nº8' . Commanded by Marcelino Álvarez. Composed of the Libertarian Youth. 
  'CNT nº9' . Commanded by José García.
  'Galicia Battalion' . Commanded by José Penido Iglesias. Composed of Galician escapees. With bases in Avilés and Colloto.

The Asturian militias had around 10,000 militiamen in September. About a third, anarchists. However, when the fifths were recruited and the battalions were created, the CNT was assigned much fewer commanders than was proportional to their numbers. Many times out of rejection of militarism, libertarians renounced taking control of battalions, giving way to the imposition of republican or communist commanders on them. Of the 52 Asturian battalions (31,000 combatants), the CNT had 9, and the Syndicalist Party had 1. In February 1937, 22 more battalions were added to the Asturian forces, totalling 75.

In Euskadi the CNT was a minority force. But just as had happened in Madrid they saw a spectacular growth as a result of the war. Despite having less than 3,000 members in May 1936, in a few months it has 35,000 members and at the end of 1936 it mobilized around 6,000 militiamen. It had the following battalions:

  'Isaac Puente Battalion' . Nº11 of the Basque militias. Commanded by Enrique Araujo.
  'Sacco-Vanzetti Battalion' . Nº12 of the Basque militias. Commanded by Juan Rivera.
  'Bakunin Battalion' . Nº65 of the Basque militias. Commanded by Luciano Mateos.
  'Celtic Battalion' . Nº30 of Basque militias. Commanded by Manuel Mata.
  'Durruti Battalion' . Nº51 of Basque militias. Commanded by Roberto Lago.
  'Malatesta Battalion' . Nº36 of Basque militias. Commanded by Jesús Eskauriaza.
  'International Battalion' . Reserve battalion made up of half anarchists and half militiamen of other ideologies.
  'Manuel Andrés 1st Engineer Battalion' . Engineer battalion.

In Santander the CNT forces were initially a part of the mixed battalions. However, some CNT battalions were also formed, such as the "Liberty Battalion" and the "CNT-FAI Battalion." Most of the anarchists in the city, curiously, were affiliated to the UGT unions.

Milicianas 

The appearance of the militias was the result of the revolutionary situation in the republican zone during the beginning of the civil war. During the first days the libertarian, socialist and communist organizations called to arms anyone who could, and wanted to, take them up. Among the volunteers were many women. From the first days of the Civil War, the newspaper "Libertarian Front" launched a campaign for the enlistment of women in the workers' militias.

The first fighters who wore the blue jumpsuit, the uniform of the workers' militias, the barracks cap with a red tassel, and a carabiner on the shoulder, or a pistol at the belt, were the libertarian women, soon followed by the Socialists and the Communists, although the latter were not supporters of the incorporation of women into the armed struggle. In a climate of indescribable exaltation, women organized themselves into popular militias and left for the different war fronts. Among them in the Harriers Column, organized by the FAI and by the Libertarian Youth, up to 200 women participated, making it by far the republican column with the most women. The Free Women, an anarcha-feminist organization did not organize any women's unit, although it was clear that it supported the effort of the militias.

Generally it was young workers from factories, workshops, shops and offices, as well as domestic workers and students, who left their jobs to enlist. Most were teenagers, such as Victoria López Práxedes, sixteen years old, who died fighting in the Talavera sector. And Lolita Maiquez, of the same age, immortalized in the "General Chronicle of the Civil War". But old militants also joined, such as Libertad Ródenas, fifty-four years old, incorporated into the Durruti Column that left for the Aragon front. They generally came from a militant revolutionary environment, with other direct family in the militias (parents, brothers, husbands). There were also internationalists like Mary Low, Simone Weil, Clara Thalmann, and other women, who participated in the war as milicianas.

From the popular astonishment caused by women defending their freedom and that of the community, battalions began to name themselves after revolutionary women: Mariana de Pineda, Aida Lafuente, Lina Ódena, Rosa Luxemburg, La Pasionaria, Margarita Nelken ...

But not everyone approved of the mobilization of women on the fronts. Indalecio Prieto even said that women's mission was in "hospitals, kitchens and factories". The role of women in warfare was called into question, with the old recurring and discriminatory old defamatory slogans. Largo Caballero, in the late autumn of 1936, sustained the discrediting campaign by signing military decrees ordering the milicianas to leave the trenches and go to rear-guard work. Women took over the management of factories, hospitals, schools, shelters, children's camps, evacuation abroad, they also drove trams and ambulances and worked in the agricultural collectives of the countryside.

The "tiznaos" 
Due to the shortage of combat means and materials, heavy vehicles such as trucks, buses or agricultural machinery were reinforced with steel plates of different thicknesses. They began to be informally known as "tiznaos" for their disparate colored camouflage. The armor of these makeshift armored vehicles was not usually very effective because the steel plates were unevenly attached, or not thick enough, to the extent that on some occasions the "tiznaos" included mattresses as a protection measure. It also happened that sometimes, when wanting to install vehicles with thicker plates to increase protection, the maneuverability and speed of the vehicle were impaired. Due to deficiencies in armor or handling, the more improvised "tiznaos" were quickly put out of action. Those that had been built with more care and with better technical means lasted longer, some of them surviving the three years of the war.

It was common that the "tiznaos" were covered in graffiti, with the name of the column to which they belonged and the initials of some party, union, or labor organization to which the militiamen who used them adhered.

Their role in the war 
Michael Alpert in his book  The People's Army of the Republic, 1936-1939  states that the confederal militia organization in Madrid had nothing to envy in the Fifth Regiment, and much less in warfare. The differences were mostly ideological. Ideology determined politics, and this made the communist forces have a much wider known role - diffused by propaganda - than the anarchist forces. Soon the politics of the Communist Party caused criticism from the republican press against the role that the militias were playing on the war fronts.

And yet, the popular militias (not only those of the CNT) saved the Republic between July and September 1936. They managed to defeat the uprising in numerous peninsular capitals such as Barcelona, Madrid, Valencia, Bilbao, Gijón. .. and the militias that would liberate Guadalajara, Cuenca, Albacete or Toledo were organized from these cities. They tried unsuccessfully to liberate Córdoba, Granada, Oviedo or Zaragoza, creating, despite their failure, stable fronts. The army, to contrast, had almost completely revolted against the Republic. And that if there were a few troops left on the republican side, on many occasions they did so without conviction, purely by chance or for fear of rebelling. The troops were at the mercy of the will of officers sympathetic to the Nationalists.

The militiamen were workers and peasants who often took up arms for the first time. They lacked military experience of any kind, which they balanced with a high morale, based on their revolutionary convictions. The troops recruited by the Falange in Castile or some troops of Requetés, as well as the militias organized by the Socialists or the Communists, faced similar difficulties. The only thing that made the difference was the quality of their weapons and command. And in these matters the anarchist militias always suffered a chronic hardship and an almost total boycott by those who controlled the arms supplies. On the nationalist side, the inexperience of the volunteers was solved by framing the Falange troops and the civil guard in secondary units, the weight being carried by the legionary or regular troops who were experienced soldiers, commanded by professional, military personnel, experienced in wartime situations. However, the Republic could not count on an experienced army, since it could not even trust its officers. The war experience had to be practically done from scratch.

It took several months for the militiamen to gain enough experience to face the other side. There was an evolution from the beginning of the war, in which several battalions fell back due to aerial bombardments in August 1936 (for example the Alcoy battalion in Córdoba or the internationalist Malatesta battalion on the Huesca front), until the time of the battles around Madrid in the winter of '36, in which the militiamen no longer retreated in the face of enemy attacks.

The militiamen (and the first soldiers, many of whom had been militiamen before) managed to counter and arrest the best-prepared army in the war, the Army of Africa. The Regulars and the Legionnaires had no rival in Spain until they reached Madrid, where they were stopped at the cost of numerous casualties. There are reports that by November 1 the militiamen had suffered no less than 35,000 casualties. In January 1937, he libertarian militiamen Cipriano Mera, converted from bricklayer to commander of the 14th Division, halted the advance of experienced Italian troops in the battle of Guadalajara.

The weakest fronts garrisoned by the militias were those of Andalusia, in which militiamen were frequently frightened by aerial bombardments. Málaga fell without having been able to organize any resistance. Given the anarchist predominance in the city, the central government of Largo Caballero chose to ignore it and marginalize it from the distribution of weapons, which would lead to its fall in February 1937. On the Extremadura front, in the Guadiana and Tajo valleys, militiamen ran away when the nationalists surrounded them, abandoning their rifles, machine guns and even cannons.

War and revolution 

Behind the frontlines, a revolution swept through the republican sector. The country's economy was taken control of by the unions, agrarian communities were created and industry was socialized. There was educational reform. Rental prices were regulated or abolished. In many places the currency was even abolished. The appearance of the Free Women, an organization of anarchist women that in practice led to the emergence of women in the political-social sphere of war, also represented what they called "a revolution within the revolution".

Unlike the PCE, PSUC, PSOE and other republican forces, the war and the revolution were seen as inseparable by the CNT, FAI and POUM, as can be found in these words of Buenaventura Durruti:

To this end, the militias helped and promoted the formation of communes in the towns through which they passed. In Aragón 450 agricultural communes made up of 423,000 people, were formed and integrated into the Council of Aragon. These communes were a source of support in the rear for the militias, in addition to probably representing the closest approach to the ideal of anarchist life that had been fought for in Spain since the First Spanish Republic.

When the Aragonese communes were dissolved in August 1937, production collapsed. The morale of resistance that had prevailed in Aragon collapsed in such a way that the republican government itself authorized the reconstruction of the communes some time later. When the Francoists launched their offensive in the Ebro Valley (after the battle of Teruel) in the spring of 1938 the front fell apart and the nationalists reached as far as Lérida and even the Mediterranean.

Militarization of militias 
The militarization of militias was a controversial issue that has been hotly debated, even within the CNT ranks themselves. Among the most authoritative voices raised against  militarization  and the formation of a traditional army, that of Durruti stood out, who in the summer of 1936 stated the following :

Cipriano Mera, on the other hand, ended up assuming an opinion fully favorable to "militarization":

The assembly organization of the militias had numerous problems, since lack of discipline was frequent, as well as riots and desertions. In the toughest battles, where the nationalist armies proved to possess more and better means, routing was not uncommon. Situations like this forced military leaders to be vigilant of their soldiers, having in many cases to take the lead in the attacks if they wanted to be followed, so many of the most capable characters fell in the front.

From the autumn of 1936, the militarization of the confederal militias was carried out against the will of many of its members -with the government of Largo Caballero and its "Decree of militarization of the Popular Militias", and the approval of the CNT members in the government -, until 1937, a period in which there was no lack of numerous conflicts regarding the matter. Within the anarchist militias, people such as the founder of the Iron Column, José Pellicer Gandía, opposed militarization, but people such as Cipriano Mera, Miguel García Vivancos and the Basque CNT militias, supported a militarization controlled by the CNT-FAI, rather than by the government. But they were in favor of a militarization controlled by the CNT-FAI and not by the government. Successive decrees of the Government obligatorily restored the military discipline characteristic of the old Army, at the same time that they established logistics and supply organizations under militarized and centralist criteria. Finally, after the Battle of Madrid in November 1936, the Government denied the services of administration and ammunition to militias that resisted militarization. Thus, the militias became regiments or divisions of a regular Army - the so-called Republican People's Army -, and the militiamen became soldiers subject to traditional military discipline.

The Friends of Durruti (4th Grouping of the Durruti Column) decided to withdraw from the Aragon front, taking their weapons with them. In addition there were conflicts in the Ascaso Column. However, the tone was that of accepting militarization due to the circumstances in which the war was entering. On the northern fronts, militarization was never questioned, with confederal militias practically militarized from the beginning. On the Central front and those of Andalusia and Extremadura, militarization was imposed without great problems, except in the Maroto Column, which was dissolved by Negrinists.

According to a report of the "Peninsular Committee of the FAI" of September 30, 1938 - quoted by José Peirats - the percentage of anarchists and confederalists in the Republican Army was 33% (about 150,000 soldiers of about 450,000 soldiers republicans). The 5th, 16th, 20th, 24th, 25th, 26th, 28th, 54th, 63rd, 70th, 71st and 77th divisions had anarchist commanders. Anarchists also had command of 2 army corps. Despite appearing to be important figures, in reality there was a clear under-representation of anarchists in the republican army.

Militias in the arts

Cinema 

  Espoir: Sierra de Teruel  ( La Esperanza  or  L'Espoir , by André Malraux, who also wrote a novel with the same title) .
  Madrid Front  (Edgar Neville, 1939), adaptation of the same name novel by the same author
  Bicycles Are for the Summer  from Jaime Chávarri, 1984 adaptation of the work of Fernando Fernán Gómez.
  The Heifer  (Luis García Berlanga, 1985)
  Land and Freedom (Ken Loach, 1995)
  Libertarias  (Vicente Aranda, 1996)
  The Anarchist's Wife  (Marie Noelle, Peter Sehr, 2009)

Photography 
 Robert Capa, author, among many others, of the controversial snapshot  The Falling Soldier  (identified as Federico Borrell García, killed in Cerro Muriano on September 5, 1936), turned into an icon of the 20th century.

Bibliography 
 The "Uncontrollable" Iron Column, March 1937, bilingual Spanish / French edition, editions Champ Libre, Paris, 1979. La Columna de Hierro y la Revolución
 Miquel Amorós,  José Pellicer Gandía, the upright anarchist. Life and work of the founder of the Heroic Iron Column , Editorial virus, Barcelona, 2009. 
 Miquel Amorós,  The revolution betrayed. The true story of Balius and Los Amigos de Durruti , Editorial virus, Barcelona, 2003. 
 Burnett Bolloten, "The Great Deception: The Left and its struggle for power in the Republican zone."
 Abel Paz,  Durruti in the Spanish Revolution , AK Press, 2006. . Translated by Chuck W. Morse.
 Abel Paz, The Story of the Iron Column: Militant Anarchism in the Spanish Civil War. AK Press and Kate Sharpley Library, 2011. . Translated by Paul Sharkey.
 
 Hans Magnus Enzensberger,  The short summer of anarchy. Durruti's life and death , Barcelona, Anagrama, 1998.
 Antoine Giménez and the Gymnologists, "Of love, war and revolution" followed by "In search of the children of the night", Logroño, Pumpkin seeds, 2009.
 Agustín Guillamón,  The CNT Defense Committees (1933-1938) , Barcelona, Aldarull Edicions, 2011. 
 José Peirats,  The CNT in the Spanish Revolution , Toulouse, 1952.

References

External links 
 Militias and military unit confederations, in the Virtual Athenaeum of To the barricades.
 Interpretive Commentary of the Plenary of Confederate Militia and Columns, by Frank Mintz
 The Spanish Revolution, 1936-39 at Anarchy Now!

 
Defunct anarchist militant groups
Military units and formations of the Spanish Civil War
Anti-fascist organisations in Spain